The 2005 Singaporean presidential election was held to elect the next president of Singapore. S. R. Nathan was re-elected in an uncontested election due to lack of eligible candidates. He was the only candidate that was granted an eligibility certificate to contest in the 2005 presidential election.

Candidates
21 application forms for the Certificate of Eligibility required to contest were collected, and forms were submitted by four candidates. After considering the candidate's applications, the Presidential Elections Committee issued one Certificate of Eligibility to the incumbent, S.R. Nathan. Nathan was the only candidate to stand nominated and thus re-electing uncontested on nomination day and was sworn-in for his second term of office on 1 September 2005.

The applications were reviewed by the Presidential Elections Committee, which consisted of:

The Returning Officer was Tan Boon Huat, the Chief Executive Director of the People's Association.

Eligible

Declared ineligible

On 9 August, Prime Minister Lee Hsien Loong called for all candidates to be open about their records, so that Singaporeans could make an informed judgment on them. He also encouraged Andrew Kuan's former employers to come forward, speak freely and tell Singaporeans what they knew about him.

On 11 August, Kuan's former employer, JTC called a news conference to provide details on the circumstances leading to Kuan's resignation in July 2004. Chong Lit Cheong, chief executive officer of JTC said that Andrew Kuan's work at JTC had been unsatisfactory since his first year there and he had been asked to resign twice in 2003 and 2004.  No details as to how his work was unsatisfactory were provided, other than a note that no fraud or other crime was involved, and he needed "quite a fair bit of hand holding". In reply, Kuan noted that he had worked at JTC Corporation for 37 months, which had extended his contract several times, and he had been given performance bonuses and a raise during this period. Another company, Hyflux, also publicly criticised Kuan.

Later, Kuan was disqualified by the Presidential Elections Committee for failing to meet the criteria for running for president. The committee said Kuan's seniority and responsibility as JTC's chief financial officer were not comparable to those required by the Constitution. A presidential candidate is required to have had experience as the chairman or CEO of a statutory board, or of a company with a paid-up capital of at least S$100 million.

References

External links
 He ran away from home when he was 16 by Zuraidah Ibrahim and Lydia Lim – Ministry of Education.
 Release medical report of S R Nathan
 Government Gazette on Presidential Elections Committee 27 May 2005

Presidential elections in Singapore
Singapore
Presidential election
Uncontested elections